Pedro Beato (born October 27, 1986) is a Dominican former professional baseball pitcher. He pitched in Major League Baseball (MLB) for the New York Mets, Boston Red Sox, Atlanta Braves, and Philadelphia Phillies.

Early life
Beato was born in Santo Domingo, Dominican Republic, and moved to Ridgewood, Queens as a child. He attended Xaverian High School in Brooklyn, New York. He was drafted by the New York Mets in the 17th round of the 2005 Major League Baseball Draft, but did not sign. He opted to attend St. Petersburg College. He played baseball in the summer for the Youth Service League.

Career

Baltimore Orioles
Beato was drafted by the Baltimore Orioles in the first round (32nd overall) of the 2006 Major League Baseball Draft.

Going into the 2007 season, Beato was rated the 99th best prospect in baseball by Baseball America. He participated in the 2007 All-Star Futures Game.

New York Mets
In the 2010 Rule 5 Draft, Beato was selected by the New York Mets off of the Norfolk Tides roster. Beato was named to the Mets' Opening Day roster. He made his major league debut on April 1, 2011.

In his first  innings, Beato allowed no earned runs, setting the Mets franchise record for longest scoreless inning streak to start a career. In those  innings, Beato allowed only nine hits and three walks.

Boston Red Sox
During the 2012 season, the Mets traded Beato to the Boston Red Sox as the player to be named later in the trade that sent Kelly Shoppach to the Mets. He was designated for assignment by the Red Sox on December 19, 2012.

Beato started the 2013 season on a minor league contract with the Triple-A Pawtucket Red Sox. His contract was selected from Pawtucket, and he was brought up to Boston on June 16, 2013.

He was designated for assignment on October 23, 2013.

Cincinnati Reds
The Cincinnati Reds claimed Beato on October 31, 2013. The Reds designated Beato for assignment on March 30, 2014.

Atlanta Braves
The Atlanta Braves claimed Beato on April 2, 2014. They optioned him to Triple-A Gwinnett on April 9, after he made one appearance. In 24 games with Gwinnett, he was 1–0 with a 3.49 ERA. On June 17, he was recalled to replace David Carpenter, who went on the disabled list. Two days later, the same fate happened to him, as he was placed on the disabled list. He was outrighted off the Braves roster on July 11, 2014. In 3 appearances with Atlanta, Beato didn't give up a run in 4 innings. Beato elected free agency in October 2014.

Second stint with Baltimore
On March 3, 2015, Beato signed a minor league deal with the Orioles. He elected free agency on November 6. He resigned with the team after the 2015 season. He became a free agent after the 2016 season.

Philadelphia Phillies
On January 7, 2017, Beato signed a minor league contract with the Philadelphia Phillies. He was added to the team's 40-man roster on July 29 and debuted with the team that night, but exited the game with a hamstring injury and was placed on the ten-day disabled list the following day. He was designated for assignment on August 17, 2017. On December 22, 2017, Beato resigned with the Phillies to a minor league contract. He elected free agency on November 2, 2018. On March 5, 2019, Beato again re-signed to a minor league contract with the team. However, he was released on March 28, 2019.

Diablos Rojos del México
On April 3, 2019, Beato signed with the Diablos Rojos del México (Mexico City Red Devils), of the Mexican League. He was released on June 19, 2019.

Long Island Ducks
On June 27, 2019, Beato signed with the Long Island Ducks of the Atlantic League of Professional Baseball. He became a free agent following the season.

References

External links

Pedro Beato at SABR (Baseball BioProject)
Pedro Beato at Baseball Almanac
Pedro Beato at Ultimate Mets Database

1986 births
Aberdeen IronBirds players
Atlanta Braves players
Boston Red Sox players
Bowie Baysox players
Buffalo Bisons (minor league) players
Delmarva Shorebirds players
Diablos Rojos del México players
Dominican Republic expatriate baseball players in Mexico
Dominican Republic expatriate baseball players in the United States
Frederick Keys players
Gulf Coast Orioles players
Gwinnett Braves players
Lehigh Valley IronPigs players
Long Island Ducks players
Living people
Major League Baseball players from the Dominican Republic
Major League Baseball pitchers
New York Mets players
Norfolk Tides players
Pawtucket Red Sox players
Philadelphia Phillies players
St. Lucie Mets players
St. Petersburg Titans baseball players
Tigres del Licey players
Xaverian High School alumni
People from Ridgewood, Queens